The praying mantis is any insect of the order Mantodea.

Praying mantis may also refer to:

Arts and entertainment
 Praying Mantis (1983 film), a film directed by Jack Gold
 Praying Mantis (film), an American psychological thriller film
 Praying Mantis (band), a New Wave of British Heavy Metal band

Military
 Operation Praying Mantis, a 1988 naval battle between US and Iranian forces
 Praying Mantis, a British prototype light tank Universal Carrier of World War II

Martial arts
 Northern Praying Mantis, the Northern Chinese martial art from Shandong
 Southern Praying Mantis, the Southern Chinese martial art of the Hakka people

See also
 Mantis (disambiguation)